This is a summary of state trade secret law in the United States and its territories. Although many U.S. states have adopted the Uniform Trade Secrets Act (UTSA), each state is responsible for defining what constitutes a trade secret. This list draws on both statutory law and the case law interpreting it.

References

Trade secrets
Lists of United States legislation